National Highway 381A, commonly referred to as NH 381A, is an inter-corridor highway connecting NH-81 near Vellakoil with NH-544 near Sankagiri through the city of Erode in South India.

Route

NH 381A connects Vellakoil, Mettupalayam, Ayyampalayam, Kumarandisavadi, Muthur, Kandasamypalayam, Muthainvalasu, Elumathur, Modakuruchi, Thannerpanthal, Sakthi Nagar (in Erode), Pallipalayam, Veppadai, Padaiveedu, and Sankakiri.

Junctions  
 
  Terminal near Vellakoil.
  near Central Bus Terminus in Erode.
  Terminal near Sankagiri.

See also 
 List of National Highways in India
 List of National Highways in India by state

References

External links
 NH 381A on OpenStreetMap

Transport in Erode
National Highways in Tamil Nadu
National highways in India